Scottish singer-songwriter Darius Danesh released two albums, three other albums, two DVDs and six singles during his lifetime. 

He recorded two studio albums, Dive In (2002) and Live Twice (2004), with both reaching top 40 in the UK Albums Chart. His debut single, "Colourblind", reached No. 1 in the UK Singles Chart in 2002. His next singles, "Rushes" and "Incredible (What I Meant to Say)", reached the top ten in the UK in 2002 and 2003, respectively.

Albums

Studio albums

Compilation albums
Pop Idol: The Big Band Album (with Idols) (release date 8 April 2002)

Other albums
War Child: 1 Love Album''' (release date 14 October 2002)Greasemania (release date 20 October 2003)

Singles

DVDsPop Idol Tour 2002 (release date 25 November 2002)Darius: The Story So Far'' (release date 28 February 2005)

References

Discographies of British artists
Rock music discographies
Darius Campbell